Asswehly SC Volleyball is a Libyan men's volleyball club. The club has been based in Misurata since 1944. It is playing in the Libyan Volleyball League.

Current squad 

Head coach:  Dragan Djordjevic 
Assistant coach:

Honors

National Achievements
Libyan Men's Volleyball League :
 Winners ( 10 titles) :
1989–90, 1995–96, 1997-98, 2000–01, 2002–03, 2013–14, 2015-16, 2017–18, 2018-2019, 2021-2022
Libyan Men's Volleyball Cup :
 Winners ( 3 titles) :
2006–07, 2013–14, 2016-17

Regional Achievements
Arab Clubs Championship :
 Winners (? x titles) :
 Runners-up (? x vice champions) :

International Achievements
African Club Championship :
 Winners (? x titles) :
 Runners up (? x vice champions) :
African Cup Winners' Cup :
 Winners (? x titles) :
 Runners up (? x vice champions) :

Professional players 

 Zouheir Elgraoui (2016-17)
 Juan Gabriel Vazquez (2016-17)
 Pedro Luis García (2016-17)
 Pablo Guzmán Parés (2015-16)
 Jean Patrice Ndaki Mboulet (2015-16)
 Simone Spescha (2013-14)
 Ahmed Yousef Afifi (2013-14)

External links
 
 
 Libyan Premier League volleyball 2016/2017

Volleyball clubs
Sports clubs in Libya
Volleyball in Libya
1944 establishments in Libya
Volleyball clubs established in 1944